End of a Gun is a 2016 American action film directed by Keoni Waxman, starring Steven Seagal in the lead role.

Plot
In Paris, Michael Decker (Steven Seagal), a former DEA agent gets involved with a British woman, Lisa Durant (Jade Ewen), when he shoots the man beating her up. She suggests he help her steal $2 million from a drug lord.

Cast
 Steven Seagal as Michael Decker
 Florin Piersic Jr. as Gage
 Jade Ewen as Lisa Durant
 Jonathan Rosenthal as Luc
 Jacob Grodnik as Trevor
 Ovidiu Niculescu as Jean
 Claudiu Bleont as Chauvin
 Alexandre Nguyen as Pee Wee 
 Andrei Ciopec as Ronnie Martin
 Victoria Ene as Delphine

Production
The film is set in France, but was shot in Romania, New Orleans and Atlanta, Georgia in August–September 2015. Waxman said the film was "very different Seagal movie than Killing Salazar - this one is more like The Keeper. Steven in suits being chased by cool French bad guys - like an Elmore Leonard story (think Out of Sight). Steven and Jade Ewen are a great crime film couple on a double crossing heist. Florin Piersic Jr. from "Killing Salazar" chasing after them. Simple and cool story this time around."

Reception
Eoin at TheActionElite.com gave the film 2/5 and wrote: "Director Keoni Waxman seems to be the only filmmaker who can get Seagal to nearly put in some effort and compared to much of his other recent movies End of a Gun is mildly less painful to sit through."

References

External links
 

American action films
American crime films
Films set in France
Films shot in Atlanta
Films shot in New Orleans
Films shot in Romania
Lionsgate films
Films directed by Keoni Waxman
2010s English-language films
2010s American films